Évelyne Buyle (born 3 June 1948) is a French actress.

Theatre

Filmography

References

External links

1948 births
Living people
French film actresses
French television actresses
20th-century French actresses
21st-century French actresses